Lord Anthony Crichton-Stuart (born 14 May 1961) is a British art historian, and former head of old master paintings at Christie's in New York, where he worked from 1991 until 2006. He is now an independent art dealer in London, specializing in Old Master Paintings.

Early life
He is the younger son of the former Beatrice Nicola Grace Weld-Forester and John Crichton-Stuart, 6th Marquess of Bute; as such, he is styled as a lord. He is also the heir presumptive to his nephew, the 8th Marquess. His elder brother was John Crichton-Stuart, 7th Marquess of Bute, a prominent race-car driver.

He is a descendant of Bernard Forbes, 8th Earl of Granard and Beatrice Mills Forbes, an American socialite who was the daughter of Ogden Mills and a descendant of the Livingston and the Schuyler families from New York.

He was educated at Ampleforth College and St Chad's College, Durham University.

Career
Lord Anthony's areas of specialty include Dutch and Flemish 17th-century paintings, and he has been active in the Old Master Paintings market for over twenty years, having worked first for the Brod Gallery in London from 1984 to 1986, and then joining the Old Master Paintings department in Christie's London in 1987. In 2004, he and his London counterpart Paul Raison played an instrumental role in the acquisition of the Hall and Knight galleries by Christie's. He has been involved in the rediscovery and sale at auction of works by Joachim Wtewael, Bernardo Bellotto, Carlo Dolci, Lorenzo Baldissera Tiepolo and Ludovico Carracci.

Personal life
In 1990, Lord Anthony married Alison Bruce, a daughter of Keith Bruce of Highgate, London. Together, they have three children; Flora Grace, Eliza Rose and Arthur Alec Crichton-Stuart.

In 1996, Lord Anthony purchased 120 East 92nd Street in New York City.

References

1961 births
Living people
Alumni of St Chad's College, Durham
British people of American descent
British people of Dutch descent
Christie's people
Livingston family
People educated at Ampleforth College
Schuyler family
Anthony Stuart
Younger sons of marquesses